Minuscule 139 (in the Gregory-Aland numbering), A202 (Soden), is a Greek minuscule manuscript of the New Testament, on parchment leaves. It is dated by a colophon to 1173.

Description 

The codex contains the text of the Gospel of Luke and Gospel of John on 233 parchment leaves (size ). The text is written in one column per page. The biblical text is surrounded by a catena.

It is believed the date 1173 was added by a later hand, though according to Gregory it is correct date.

Text 

The Greek text of the codex is a representative of the Byzantine text-type. Aland placed it in Category V.
According to the Claremont Profile Method it represents textual cluster 291 in Luke 1. In Luke 10 and Luke 20 no profile was made.

History 

According to the colophon it was written in 1173, but the colophon was not written by the original scribe, only by a somewhat later hand.

The manuscript was examined by Birch (about 1782) and Scholz. C. R. Gregory saw it in 1886.

It is currently housed at the Vatican Library (Vat. gr. 758), at Rome.

See also 

 List of New Testament minuscules
 Biblical manuscript
 Textual criticism

References

Further reading 

 

Greek New Testament minuscules
12th-century biblical manuscripts
Manuscripts of the Vatican Library